Meritt Records was a jazz and blues record company and label that existed from 1925 to 1929. It was founded in Kansas City by Winston Holmes, the owner of a music store. Records were made in his studio and sold only in his store.

Holmes produced about 20 double-sided acoustically recorded gramophone records in the mid and late 1920s. Most of the sides are of locally based jazz and blues performers, plus some gospel music and sermons.

Partial Discography

1925

2201 City Of The Dead / Cabbage Head Blues

Lena Kimbrough / Sylvester & Lena Kimbrough

1926

2203 I've Even Heard Of Thee / The Downfall Of Nebuchadnezzer

Rev. J.C. Burnett

2204 The Well Of Salvation

Rev. H.C. Gatewood

1927

2206 Down Home Syncopated Blues / Meritt Stomp

George E. Lee And His Novelty Singing Orchestra

George E. Lee, ts, v, dir: Sam Utterbach, t / Thurston Maupins, tb / Clarence Taylor, ss, as / Jesse Stone, p, a / George Rousseau, bj / Clint Weaver, bb / Abe Price, d / Julia Lee, v.

See also
 List of record labels

References

Defunct record labels of the United States
Jazz record labels
Blues record labels